Muhammad Adil Shah (r. 1554–1555) was the fourth ruler of the Suri dynasty, a late medieval Afghan dynasty in the northern Indian subcontinent.

Early life
He was the son of Nizam Khan, the younger brother of the Sultan Sher Shah Suri. Adil's sister, Bibi Bai, was married to Islam Shah Suri. His real name was Muhammad Mubariz Khan. He was responsible for the assassination of Firuz Shah Suri, the twelve-year-old son of Islam Shah Suri, in 1554. Then he ascended the throne as the last sultan of the united empire. He appointed Hemu as his Wazir.

History
In 1555, Adil's brother in law, Ibrahim Shah Suri of Agra, revolted. Adil Shah's army was defeated and he lost the throne of Delhi.  Soon, the empire founded by Sher Shah was divided into four parts. As Delhi and Agra came under the rule of Ibrahim Shah Suri, only the territories from the vicinity of Agra to Bihar remained under Adil. Shamsuddin Muhammad Shah already declared independence of Bengal in 1554. But hostility did not end with the division of empire.

Ibrahim Shah Suri was then defeated by Sikandar Shah Suri at Farah, 32 km from Agra, and thus lost the possession of Delhi and Agra. Then Ibrahim renewed his strife with Adil, but he was defeated by Hemu twice, once near Kalpi and again near Khanua. He took refuge in the Bayana fort, which was besieged by Hemu.

Muhammad Shah of Bengal approached near Kalpi, Adil had to recall Hemu to Kalpi. Muhammad Shah  was defeated and killed at Chhapparghatta near Kalpi. Adil captured Bengal and appointed Shahbaz Khan as the Governor. He made Chunar his capital.

In 1557, Adil was defeated and killed in a battle with the Bengal Sultan Khizr Khan Suri, the son of Muhammad Shah.

See also
 Suri dynasty

Notes

Sur Empire
16th-century Indian Muslims
Indian people of Pashtun descent
Indian people of Afghan descent
1557 deaths
1554 in India
1555 in India
Year of birth unknown
16th-century Indian monarchs
16th-century Afghan people